was a Japanese ryūkōka, gunka, march, fight song and film score composer. His real name was also Yūji Koseki, but its kanji was 古關 勇治.

Koseki entered Nippon Columbia in 1930. He composed Hanshin Tigers' song "Rokko Oroshi" in 1936. His famous military song titled  was released in 1937. Famous songs composed by him included "The Bells of Nagasaki" and "Mothra's song". Ichiro Fujiyama sang "The Bells of Nagasaki" in 1949. "Mothra's song", sung by The Peanuts, was used in the 1961 movie Mothra. "Olympic March" in 1964. He also arranged "Olympic Hymn" for Orchestra.

Filmography 
Music for films:
 Momotaro's Divine Sea Warriors (1945)
 Kane no naru oka: Dai san hen, kuro no maki (1949)
 Odoroki ikka (おどろき一家) (1949)
 The Bells of Nagasaki (1950)
 A Mother's Love (1950)
 Mothra (1961)

See also
Yell (TV series), the main character is inspired by him.

References

External links 
 Memorial Hall of Yūji Koseki

1909 births
1989 deaths
20th-century Japanese composers
20th-century Japanese male musicians
Japanese film score composers
Japanese male film score composers
Musicians from Fukushima Prefecture
Recipients of the Medal of Honor (Japan)